This page list topics related to ancient Egypt.

0–9 

 4.2-kiloyear event
 317a and 317b mummies
 1770 (mummy)

A 

 A. J. Arkell
 Aa (architect)
 Aabeni (high steward)
 Aamu
 Aani
 Aaru
 Aat (queen)
 Abadiyeh, Egypt
 Abar (Queen)
 Abbott Papyrus
 Abdi-Ashirta
 Abdi-Heba
 Abdi-Riša
 Abimilki
 Abtu
 Abu Ballas
 Abu Gorab
 Abu Mena
 Abu Rawash
 Abu Simbel
 Abusir
 Abusir Bana
 Abusir (Lake Mariout)
 Abusir Papyri
 Abu Tesht
 Abuwtiyuw
 Abydos, Egypt
 Abydos boats
 Abydos Dynasty
 Abydos graffiti
 Abydos King List
 Achaemenes (satrap)
 Achaemenid coinage
 Achaemenid Empire
 Adda-danu
 Addaya
 Adder stone
 Adikhalamani
 Adolf Erman
 Adolphe Reinach
 Adze
 Adze-on-block (hieroglyph)
 Aegyptus
 Aelius Gallus
 Aetia (Callimachus)
 Agilkia Island
 A-Group culture
 Ahaneith
 Ahhotep I
 Ahhotep II
 Ahmed Fakhry
 Ahmed Kamal (Egyptologist)
 Ahmed Moussa (Egyptologist)
 Ahmes
 Ahmose (18th dynasty)
 Ahmose (princess)
 Ahmose (queen)
 Ahmose called Si-Tayit
 Ahmose called Turo
 Ahmose I
 Ahmose Inhapy
 Ahmose Sapair
 Ahmose, son of Ebana
 Ahmose-ankh
 Ahmose-Henutemipet
 Ahmose-Henuttamehu
 Ahmose-Meritamon (17th dynasty)
 Ahmose-Meritamun
 Ahmose-Nebetta
 Ahmose-Nefertari
 Ahmose-Sitamun
 Ahmose-Sitkamose
 Aker (deity)
 Akhenaten
 Akhenaten: Son of the Sun
 Akhet (hieroglyph)
 Akhetaa
 Akhethetep
 Akhethetep Hemi
 Akhethetep (Louvre mastaba)
 Akhethetep (official)
 Akhethetep (Old Kingdom official)
 Akhmim
 Akhmim wooden tablets
 Akhnaten (opera)
 Akhnaton (play)
 Akhraten
 Akhty (deity)
 Akizzi
 Akoris, Egypt
 Aktisanes
 Alabastron
 Alan Gardiner
 Alara of Kush
 Alashiya
 Albert Lythgoe
 Alcetas
 Alchemy
 Alessandra Nibbi
 Alessandro Barsanti
 Alexander Badawy
 Alexander Balas
 Alexander Helios
 Alexander Henry Rhind
 Alexander I of Epirus
 Alexander IV of Macedon
 Alexander the Great
 Alexandria
 Alexandria School of Medicine
 Alexandrian Pleiad
 Alexandrian school
 Alfred Lucas (chemist)
 Alodia
 Amaniastabarqa
 Amanibakhi
 Amanikhabale
 Amanikhareqerem
 Amanikhatashan
 Amanimalel
 Amanineteyerike
 Amanishakheto
 Amanislo
 Amanitore
 Amanmašša
 Amantekha
 Amara, Nubia
 Amarna
 Amarna art
 Amarna Era
 Amarna letters
 Amarna letters–localities and their rulers
 Amarna EA 1
 Amarna EA 2
 Amarna EA 3
 Amarna EA 4
 Amarna EA 5
 Amarna EA 6
 Amarna EA 7
 Amarna EA 8
 Amarna EA 9
 Amarna EA 10
 Amarna EA 11
 Amarna EA 12
 Amarna EA 15
 Amarna EA 19
 Amarna EA 23
 Amarna EA 26
 Amarna EA 27
 Amarna EA 35
 Amarna EA 38
 Amarna EA 39
 Amarna EA 59
 Amarna EA 75
 Amarna EA 86
 Amarna EA 100
 Amarna EA 144
 Amarna EA 147
 Amarna EA 149
 Amarna EA 153
 Amarna EA 156
 Amarna EA 158
 Amarna EA 161
 Amarna EA 170
 Amarna EA 205
 Amarna EA 223
 Amarna EA 245
 Amarna EA 252
 Amarna EA 254
 Amarna EA 256
 Amarna EA 270
 Amarna EA 271
 Amarna EA 282
 Amarna EA 286
 Amarna EA 287
 Amarna EA 288
 Amarna EA 289
 Amarna EA 290
 Amarna EA 299
 Amarna EA 323
 Amarna EA 325
 Amarna EA 362
 Amarna EA 364
 Amarna EA 365
 Amarna EA 366
 Amarna EA 367
 Amarna EA 369
 Amarna Period
 Amarna Princess
 Amarna Royal Tombs Project
 Amarna succession
 Amarna Tomb 1
 Amarna Tomb 3
 Amarna Tomb 5
 Amarna Tomb 7
 Amasis II
 Amaymon
 Amduat
 Amelia Edwards
 Amenemhat I
 Amenemhat II
 Amenemhat III
 Amenemhat IV
 Amenemhat VI
 Amenemhat (chief of Teh-khet)
 Amenemhat (High Priest of Amun)
 Amenemhat (nomarch, 16th nome)
 Amenemhat (son of Thutmose III)
 Amenemhatankh
 Amenemhatankh (vizier)
 Amenemipet called Pairy
 Amenemnisu
 Amenemope (author)
 Amenemope (pharaoh)
 Amenemopet (prince)
 Amenemopet (princess)
 Amenemopet (Viceroy of Kush)
 Amenherkhepshef
 Amenhotep I
 Amenhotep II
 Amenhotep III
 Amenhotep (official)
 Amenhotep called Huy
 Amenhotep (High Priest of Amun)
 Amenhotep (high steward)
 Amenhotep (Huy)
 Amenhotep, Priest of Amun (18th Dynasty)
 Amenhotep (prince)
 Amenhotep, son of Hapu
 Amenhotep (treasurer)
 Amenhotep (Viceroy of Kush)
 Amenia (wife of Horemheb)
 Amenirdis I
 Amenirdis II
 Amenmesse
 Amenmose (noble)
 Amenmose (prince)
 Amenmose, son of Pendjerty
 Amenmose (TT42)
 Amenmose (vizier)
 Ameny (general)
 Ameny (high steward)
 Ameny (vizier)
 Ameny (vizier under Amenemhat III)
 Ameny Qemau
 Amesemi
 Amestris
 Amethu called Ahmose
 Am-heh
 Amka (official)
 Ammeris
 Amminapes
 Ammit
 Ammu Aahotepre
 Ammunira
 Amratian culture
 Amu (pharaoh)
 Amu-Aa
 Amum-Her-Khepesh-Ef
 Amun
 Amunet
 Amun-her-khepeshef
 Amun-her-khepeshef (20th dynasty)
 Amyntas (son of Andromenes)
 Amyrtaeus
 Anat
 Anat-her
 Ancient Egypt
 Ancient Egypt in the Western imagination
 Ancient Egypt (magazine)
 Ancient Egyptian afterlife beliefs
 Ancient Egyptian agriculture
 Ancient Egyptian anatomical studies
 Ancient Egyptian architecture
 Ancient Egyptian conception of the soul
 Ancient Egyptian creation myths
 Ancient Egyptian cuisine
 Ancient Egyptian deities
 Ancient Egyptian flint jewelry
 Ancient Egyptian funerary practices
 Ancient Egyptian funerary texts
 Ancient Egyptian Hieroglyphs: A Practical Guide
 Ancient Egyptian literature
 Ancient Egyptian mathematics
 Ancient Egyptian medicine
 Ancient Egyptian multiplication
 Ancient Egyptian navy
 Ancient Egyptian offering formula
 Ancient Egyptian offerings
 Ancient Egyptian philosophy
 Ancient Egyptian pottery
 Ancient Egyptian race controversy
 Ancient Egyptian religion
 Ancient Egyptian retainer sacrifices
 Ancient Egyptian royal ships
 Ancient Egyptian royal titulary
 Ancient Egyptian technology
 Ancient Egyptian trade
 Ancient Egyptian units of measurement
 Ancient Egyptian winged sun
 Ancient Near East
 Ancient Records of Egypt
 Andjety
 Anedjib
 Anen
 Anhur
 Anhurmose
 Aniba (Nubia)
 Animal mummy
 Ankh
 Ankh wedja seneb
 Ankh-ef-en-Khonsu i
 Ankhefensekhmet
 Ankhesenamun
 Ankhesenpaaten Tasherit
 Ankhesenpepi I
 Ankhesenpepi II
 Ankhesenpepi III
 Ankhesenpepi IV
 Ankhhaf
 Ankhhaf (sculpture)
 Ankhhor
 Ankhkherednefer
 Ankhmare
 Ankhnesneferibre
 Ankhtifi
 Ankhu
 Ankhwennefer (vizier)
 Ankhwennefer (pharaoh)
 Anlamani
 Annals of Amenemhat II
 Annals of Thutmose III
 Anonymous Tombs in Amarna
 Anput
 Anra scarab
 Anthylla
 Antigonus I Monophthalmus
 Antinoöpolis
 Antiochus IV Epiphanes
 Antiochus VII Sidetes
 Antipater
 Antirhodos
 Antiu
 Antoni Józef Śmieszek
 Antonio Lebolo
 Anubis
 Anubis Shrine
 Anuket
 Anuketemheb
 Anysis
 Apedemak
 Apep
 'Apepi
 Apepi
 Aperanat
 Aperel
 Aphroditopolite Nome
 Apis (city)
 Apis (deity)
 Apis Papyrus
 Apollonopolis Parva (Hypselis)
 Apollonos Hydreium
 Apries
 Apt (Egyptian)
 Aqen
 Aqrakamani
 Arakamani
 Aramatle-qo
 Archon of Pella
 Arensnuphis
 Aretalogy
 Arghul
 Arnekhamani
 Arnouphis
 Aristander
 Armant, Egypt
 Arms-in-embrace (hieroglyph)
 Arqa
 Arqamani
 Arsames (satrap of Egypt)
 Arsawuya
 Arses of Persia
 Arsinoe (Gulf of Suez)
 Arsinoe I
 Arsinoe II
 Arsinoe III of Egypt
 Arsinoe IV
 Arsinoe of Macedon
 Art of ancient Egypt
 Artabanus of Persia
 Artabazos II
 Artakama
 Artaxerxes I
 Artaxerxes II
 Artaxerxes III
 Arthur Callender
 Arthur Cruttenden Mace
 Arthur Weigall
 Artificial cranial deformation
 Artist's Sketch of Pharaoh Spearing a Lion
 Arty (Queen)
 Aryandes
 Asander
 Ash (deity)
 Ashakhet I
 Ashakhet II
 Ashayet
 Asiya
 Askut
 Aspelta
 Assessors of Maat
 Assyrian conquest of Egypt
 Astarte
 Astronomical ceiling of Senenmut's Tomb
 Aswan
 Asyut
 Atakhebasken
 Atef
 Aten
 Atenism
 Athanasius Kircher
 Athribis
 Athribis (Upper Egypt)
 Athribis Project
 Atlanersa
 Attalus (son of Andromenes)
 Atum
 Auguste Mariette
 Aulus Avilius Flaccus
 Autobiography of Ahmose Pen-Nekhebet
 Autobiography of Harkhuf
 Autobiography of Weni
 Autophradates
 Avaris
 Avenue of Sphinxes
 Ay (pharaoh)
 Aya (queen)
 Ayyab
 Aziru

B 

 B (hieroglyph)
 Ba (pharaoh)
 Babaef II
 Babi (mythology)
 Babylon Fortress
 Badarian culture
 Bahr Yussef
 Baka (prince)
 Bakenkhonsu
 Bakenranef
 Bakenrenef (vizier)
 Baketmut
 Baketwernel
 Balakros
 Balanos oil
 Banebdjedet
 Banishment Stela
 Ba-Pef
 Baqet III
 Barbara Adams (Egyptologist)
 Bardiya
 Baris
 Baris (ship)
 Barsine
 Baskakeren
 Bastet
 Bat (goddess)
 Bata (god)
 Battiscombe Gunn
 Battle of Bitter Lakes
 Battle of Carchemish
 Battle of Djahy
 Battle of Hamath
 Battle of Kadesh
 Battle of Megiddo (15th century BC)
 Battle of Megiddo (609 BC)
 Battle of Pelusium
 Battle of Perire
 Battle of Raphia
 Battle of the Delta
 Battlefield Palette
 Baufra
 Bawit
 Bay (chancellor)
 Beautiful Festival of the Valley
 Beauty and cosmetics in ancient Egypt
 Bebi (vizier)
 Bebiankh
 Bebnum
 Bee (heraldry)
 Bee (hieroglyph)
 Behbeit El Hagar
 Behenu
 Bek (sculptor)
 Beketamun
 Beketaten
 Bembine Tablet
 Ben-Azen
 Benben
 Benerib
 Beni Hasan
 Beni Hasan funerary boat
 Bennu
 Bennu heron
 Bent Pyramid
 Bentresh stela
 Berenice I of Egypt
 Berenice II of Egypt
 Berenice III
 Berenice IV
 Berenice Syra
 Berenice Troglodytica
 Berlin Green Head
 Berlin Papyrus 6619
 Bernard Bruyère
 Bes
 Betrest
 Betsy Bryan
 Bigeh
 Bikheris
 Bill Field
 Bintanath
 Bir Kiseiba
 Biridašwa
 Biridiya
 Birth tusk
 Biryawaza
 Blemmyes
 Block statue
 Bob Brier
 Bocchoris vase
 Bone-with-meat (hieroglyph)
 Bonn Egyptian Museum
 Book of Caverns
 Book of Gates
 Book of Nut
 Book of Sothis
 Book of the Dead
 Book of the Dead (Art Institute of Chicago)
 Book of the Dead of Amen-em-hat
 Book of the Dead of Nehem-es-Rataui
 Book of the Dead of Qenna
 Book of the Earth
 Book of the Faiyum
 Book of the Heavenly Cow
 Book of Thoth
 Book of Traversing Eternity
 Books of Breathing
 Boris de Rachewiltz
 Boris Turayev
 Boston Green Head
 Botanical garden of Thutmosis III
 Boundary Stelae of Akhenaten
 Bowstring (hieroglyph)
 Boyo Ockinga
 Branch (hieroglyph)
 Brazier (hieroglyph)
 Breathing Permit of Hôr
 British Museum Department of Ancient Egypt and Sudan
 British school of diffusionism
 Bronze Sphinx of Thutmose III
 Brooklyn Papyrus
 Brugsch Papyrus
 Bubasteum
 Bubastis
 Bubastite Portal
 Buchis
 Buhen
 Building the Great Pyramid
 Bull (ka hieroglyph)
 Bull (pharaoh)
 Bull Palette
 Bulletin de l'Institut Français d'Archéologie Orientale
 Bunefer
 Bureau of Correspondence of Pharaoh
 Buried Pyramid
 Burna-Buriash II
 Busiris (Aphroditopolis)
 Bust of Amenemhat V
 Bust of Cleopatra
 Buto

C 

 Caesareum of Alexandria
 Caesarion
 Calas (general)
 Callisthenes
 Cambyses II
 Canopic chest
 Canopic jar
 Canopus, Egypt
 Caphtor
 Caranus (hetairos)
 Carlsberg papyrus
 Carnarvon Tablet
 Carob (hieroglyph)
 Cartonnage
 Cartouche
 Casluhim
 Cataracts of the Nile
 Cats in ancient Egypt
 Cattle count
 Cavern deities of the underworld
 Cecil Mallaby Firth
 Central Field, Giza
 Cemetery GIS
 C-Group culture
 Chaeremon of Alexandria
 Chair of Reniseneb
 Champollion: A Scribe for Egypt
 Chapelle Rouge
 Chares of Mytilene
 Chariotry in ancient Egypt
 Charles Allberry
 Charles Edwin Wilbour
 Charles Kuentz (Egyptologist)
 Charmion (servant to Cleopatra)
 Chester Beatty Medical Papyrus
 Chester Beatty Papyri
 Child (hieroglyph)
 Chris Naunton
 Christian Greco
 Christian Jacq
 Christiane Desroches Noblecourt
 Chronological synchronism
 C. Jouco Bleeker
 Claude Sicard
 Claude Traunecker
 Clay tablet
 Cleitarchus
 Cleomenes of Naucratis
 Cleopatra (1963 film)
 Cleopatra I Syra
 Cleopatra II
 Cleopatra III
 Cleopatra IV
 Cleopatra V
 Cleopatra VI
 Cleopatra
 Cleopatra race controversy
 Cleopatra Selene
 Cleopatra Selene II
 Cleopatra Thea
 Cleopatra's Needle, London
 Cleopatra's Needle (New York City)
 Cliff tomb of Hatshepsut
 Clysma
 Coenus (general)
 Coffin of Nedjemankh
 Coffin Texts
 Coiled sewn sandals
 Collection of funerary steles in the National Museum of Brazil
 Colossal quartzite statue of Amenhotep III
 Colossal red granite statue of Amenhotep III
 Colossal statue of Amenhotep III and Tiye
 Colossal Statues of Akhenaten at East Karnak
 Colossi of Memnon
 Coma, Egypt
 Commemorative scarabs of Amenhotep III
 Commission des Sciences et des Arts
 Complaints of Khakheperraseneb
 Conservation and restoration of papyrus
 Coptic language
 Coptos Decree
 Coptos Decrees
 Coregency Stela
 Coronation of the pharaoh
 Cornelius Gallus
 Cosmetic palette
 Cosmetic palette in the form of a Nile tortoise
 Cosmetic Spoon: Young Girl Swimming
 Craterus
 Crocodile (pharaoh)
 Crook and flail
 Cross-ndj (hieroglyph)
 Crown of justification
 Crowns of Egypt
 Cultural tourism in Egypt
 Curse of the pharaohs
 Cursive hieroglyphs
 Cusae
 Cynane
 Cynocephaly
 Cynopolis
 Cyrus the Great
 Cyrus the Younger

D 

 Dabenarti
 Dagi
 Dagi (Ancient Egyptian official)
 Dahshur
 Dahshur boats
 Dakhamunzu
 Damanhur
 Dance in ancient Egypt
 Dar al-Manasir
 Darb El Arba'īn
 Darius the Great
 Darius II
 Darius III
 David O'Connor (Egyptologist)
 David Rohl
 Death of Cleopatra
 Debeira
 Deben (unit)
 Decan
 Decipherment of ancient Egyptian scripts
 Decline of ancient Egyptian religion
 Decree of Canopus
 Decree of Nectanebo I
 Dedi
 Dedumose I
 Dedumose II
 Dedun
 Dedusobek Bebi
 Deir el-Bahari
 Deir el-Ballas
 Deir el-Gabrawi
 Deir el-Medina
 Demetrius II Nicator
 Demotic (Egyptian)
 Demotic Chronicle
 Den (pharaoh)
 Dendera light
 Dendera Temple complex
 Dendera zodiac
 Den seal impressions
 Denyen
 Department of Egyptian Antiquities of the Louvre
 Depiction of Hatshepsut's birth and coronation
 Description de l'Égypte
 Deshret
 Determinative
 Detlef Franke
 Diadochi
 Diary of Merer
 Didia
 Dinocrates
 Dionysus-Osiris
 Discovery of the tomb of Tutankhamun
 Dispute between a man and his Ba
 Divine Adoratrice of Amun
 Djadjaemankh
 Djahy
 Djaty
 Djau
 Djed
 Djedankhre Montemsaf
 Djedefhor
 Djedefre
 Prince Djedi
 Djedi Project
 Djediufankh
 Djedkare Isesi
 Djedkare Shemai
 Djedkheperew
 Djedkhonsuefankh
 Djedmaatesankh
 Djedptahiufankh
 Djefaihapi
 Djefatnebti
 Djehuti
 Djehuty (High Priest of Amun)
 Djehutihotep
 Djehuty (general)
 Djehuty (overseer of the treasury)
 Djehutyemhat
 Djehutynakht
 Djehutyhotep (chief of Teh-khet)
 Djer
 Djeseretnebti
 Djet
 Djoser
 Djsr (arm with powerstick)
 DNA history of Egypt
 Donald B. Redford
 Donald P. Ryan
 Donations of Alexandria
 Dotawo
 Double Falcon
 Double Pyramid
 Dra' Abu el-Naga'
 Dramatic Ramesseum Papyrus
 Dream Stele
 Drusilla
 Duaenhor
 Duaenre
 Duathathor-Henuttawy
 Duat
 Duatentopet
 Dung beetle
 DU-Teššup
 Dwarfs and pygmies in ancient Egypt
 Dynastic race theory
 Dynasties of ancient Egypt

E 

 E. A. Wallis Budge
 Early Dynastic Period (Egypt)
 Early life of Cleopatra
 Ebers Papyrus
 Edda Bresciani
 Edfu
 Edfu-Project
 Edfu South pyramid
 Edme-François Jomard
 Édouard de Villiers du Terrage
 Édouard Empain
 Édouard Naville
 Edward Hincks
 Edward R. Ayrton
 Edwin C. Brock
 Edwin Smith (Egyptologist)
 Edwin Smith Papyrus
 Egg (hieroglyph)
 Egypt (TV series)
 Egypt Exploration Society
 Egyptian algebra
 Egyptian astronomy
 Egyptian biliteral signs
 Egyptian blue
 Egyptian calendar
 Egyptian chronology
 Egyptian Collection of the Hermitage Museum
 Egyptian faience
 Egyptian finger and toe stall
 Egyptian fraction
 Egyptian geometry
 Egyptian gold stater
 Egyptian Grammar: Being an Introduction to the Study of Hieroglyphs
 Egyptian hieroglyphs
 Egyptian–Hittite peace treaty
 Egyptian Journeys with Dan Cruickshank
 Egyptian language
 Egyptian Mathematical Leather Roll
 Egyptian medical papyri
 Egyptian Museum
 Egyptian Museum (Milan)
 Egyptian Museum of Berlin
 Egyptian mythology
 Egyptian numerals
 Egyptian pool
 Egyptian pyramid construction techniques
 Egyptian pyramids
 Egyptian Revival architecture
 Egyptian Revival architecture in the British Isles
 Egyptian sun temple
 Egyptian temple
 Egyptian Theatre
 Egyptian triliteral signs
 Egyptiotes
 Egyptology
 Egyptomania
 Eighth Dynasty of Egypt
 Eighteenth Dynasty of Egypt
 Eighteenth Dynasty of Egypt family tree
 El-Amra clay model of cattle
 El-Amrah
 El Araba El Madfuna
 El-Assasif
 El-Gabal el-Ahmar
 El Hiba
 Elkab
 El-Kurru
 El Lahun
 Elephant (pharaoh)
 Elephantine
 Elephantine papyri and ostraca
 Eleventh Dynasty of Egypt
 Eleventh Dynasty of Egypt family tree
 El Hawawish
 Elizabeth Thomas (Egyptologist)
 El-Khokha
 El Lahun
 El Mo'alla
 El Qattah
 El Qurn
 El Sheikh Sa'id
 El-Tarif
 Embalming cache
 Emblem of the East
 Emblem of the West
 Émile Amélineau
 Émile Baraize
 Endaruta
 Enišasi
 Ennead
 Epaphus
 Epip
 Eratosthenes
 Ergamenes
 Erigyius
 Erman Papyrus
 Ernesto Schiaparelli
 Esna
 Essai sur les hiéroglyphes des Égyptiens
 Etakkama
 Eugène Lefébure
 Eumenes
 Eurydice of Egypt
 Excerebration
 Execration texts
 Exhibitions of artifacts from the tomb of Tutankhamun
 Exploration of the Valley of the Kings
 Eye of Horus
 Eye of Ra

F 

 Face (hieroglyph)
 Fadrus
 Fag el-Gamous
 Faiyum
 Fall of Ashdod
 False door
 Famine Stela
 Family tree of the Twenty-first, Twenty-second, and Twenty-third Dynasties of Egypt
 Fan-bearer on the Right Side of the King
 Faras
 Fayum mummy portraits
 Festival Hall of Thutmose III
 Festival Songs of Isis and Nephthys
 Fifteenth Dynasty of Egypt
 Fifth Dynasty of Egypt
 Filiative nomen
 Finger Snail
 First Dynasty of Egypt
 First Dynasty of Egypt family tree
 First Intermediate Period of Egypt
 Fish (pharaoh)
 Fish cosmetic palette 
 Flail
 Flaxman Charles John Spurrell
 Flinders Petrie
 Flooding of the Nile
 Foreign contacts of ancient Egypt
 Foreleg of ox
 Foundation deposit
 Four sons of Horus
 Fourteenth Dynasty of Egypt
 Fourth Dynasty of Egypt
 Fourth Dynasty of Egypt family tree
 Francesco Salvolini
 Francis Llewellyn Griffith
 François Chabas
 Fraser Tombs
 Frederick W. Green (Egyptologist)
 French campaign in Egypt and Syria
 Funerary cone
 Funerary cult

G 

 Gabal El Haridi
 Gate deities of the underworld
 Gebel el-Silsila
 Gaius Avidius Heliodorus
 Gaius Petronius
 Game piece (hieroglyph)
 Ganymedes
 Gardens of ancient Egypt
 Gardiner's sign list
 Gaston Maspero
 Gates to the Temple of Medamud
 Gayer-Anderson cat
 Gautseshen
 Gaza
 Geb
 Gebel el-Arak Knife
 Gebelein
 Gebelein predynastic mummies
 Gegi
 Gemenefhorbak
 Gemenefkhonsbak
 Gemniemhat
 Genealogy of Ankhefensekhmet
 Georg Ebers
 Georg Steindorff
 Georg Zoëga
 George Andrew Reisner
 George Gliddon
 George Herbert, 5th Earl of Carnarvon
 George Willoughby Fraser
 Georges Aaron Bénédite
 Georges Daressy
 Georges Goyon
 Georgios I of Makuria
 Georgios II of Makuria
 Geraldine Harris
 Gerzeh culture
 Gilukhipa
 Giovanni Belzoni
 Giovanni Kminek-Szedlo
 Gisr el-Mudir
 Giuseppe Ferlini
 Giza East Field
 Giza West Field
 Giza Plateau
 Giza pyramid complex
 Giza Solar boat museum
 Giza writing board
 Glasgow Chronology
 Glossary of ancient Egypt artifacts
 Glossenkeil (Amarna letters)
 Goblet drum
 God's Wife
 God's Wife of Amun
 Gold (hieroglyph)
 Göttinger Miszellen
 Graffito of Esmet-Akhom
 Grafton Elliot Smith
 Grammaire égyptienne
 Grand Egyptian Museum
 Grape arbor (hieroglyph)
 Great Hymn to the Aten
 Great Hypostyle Hall
 Great Karnak Inscription
 Great Mendes Stela
 Great Pyramid of Giza
 Great Royal Wife
 Great Sphinx of Giza
 Great Sphinx of Tanis
 Great Temple of the Aten
 Greek Magical Papyri
 Greenfield papyrus
 Greeting-gift (Shulmani)
 Gurob
 Gustave Jéquier
 Guy Brunton
 Gynaecopolis

H 

 Ha (mythology)
 Ha (queen)
 Haankhef
 Haankhes
 Haapi
 Habiru
 Hadit
 Hakor
 Hall of Records
 Hana Vymazalová
 Hand (hieroglyph)
 Hand drill (hieroglyph)
 Hand-with-droplets (hieroglyph)
 Hapi (Nile god)
 Hapuseneb
 Harageh
 Hare (hieroglyph)
 Haremakhet
 Harem conspiracy
 Hare nome
 Harkhebi
 Harper's Songs
 Harpocrates
 Harpoon (hieroglyph)
 Harry Burton (Egyptologist)
 Harsiese A
 Harsiese B
 Harsiese (C)
 Harsiese (High Priest of Ptah)
 Harsiesi
 Harsiotef
 Harwa
 Hat (High Priest of Osiris)
 Hat Hor
 Hathor
 Hathor (month)
 Hathorhotep
 Hatmehit
 Hatnub
 Hatshepsut
 Hatshepsut: Daughter of Amun
 Hatshepsut (king's daughter)
 Haty-a
 Hauron
 Hawara
 Head cone
 Head of Nefertem
 Hearst Expedition
 Hearst papyrus
 Heart scarab
 Hebenu
 Hedetet
 Hedjet
 Hedjetnebu
 Hedjhotep
 Hedju Hor
 Heh (god)
 Heinrich Karl Brugsch
 Heinrich Menu von Minutoli
 Heka (god)
 Hekat
 Hekenuhedjet
 Heqet
 Helicopter hieroglyphs
 Heliopolis (ancient Egypt)
 Heliopolite Nome
 Hellenion (Naucratis)
 Hellenistic period
 Helmut Satzinger
 Helwan (cemetery)
 Hemaka
 Hemamieh
 Hemen
 Hemetre
 Hemiunu
 Hemsut
 Hemhem crown
 Henenu (high steward)
 Henet
 Henhenet
 Hennu
 Henri Frankfort
 Henry George Fischer
 Henry Hall (Egyptologist)
 Henry Salt (Egyptologist)
 Henutmehyt
 Henutmire
 Henutsen
 Henuttaneb
 Henut Taui
 Henuttawy (19th dynasty)
 Henuttawy (princess)
 Henuttawy (priestess)
 Henuttawy C
 Henutwati
 Hephaestion
 Hephaestion of Thebes
 Heptastadion
 Hepu (vizier)
 Heqaib
 Heqaib III
 Heqanakht
 Heqanakht papyri
 Heqanefer
 Heqet
 Heracleion
 Heracleopolis Magna
 Herbert Eustis Winlock
 Herihor
 Hermann Ranke
 Heryshaf 
 Herit
 Hermanubis
 Hermes Trismegistus
 Hermopolis
 Hermopolis (Butosos)
 Hermopolis (Lower Egypt)
 Herneith
 Heroninos Archive
 Heru-ra-ha
 Herwer
 Heryshaf
 Hesat
 Hesy-Ra
 Hetepheres (princess)
 Hetepheres I
 Hetepheres II
 Hetephernebti
 Hetepi
 Hetepi (priest)
 Hetepti (king's mother)
 Hewernef
 Hieracon
 Hieracosphinx
 Hieratic
 Hieroglyph
 Hieroglyphs Without Mystery
 High Priest of Amun
 High Priest of Osiris
 High Priest of Ptah
 High Priest of Ra
 High steward (Ancient Egypt)
 Hill-country (hieroglyph)
 Hippopotamus (hieroglyph)
 History of Alexandria
 History of ancient Egypt
 History of Persian Egypt
 History of the Karnak Temple complex
 History of timekeeping devices in Egypt
 Homosexuality in ancient Egypt
 Hor
 Hor (high steward)
 Hor-Aha
 Horapollo
 Horbaef
 Horemheb
 Horemkhauef
 Hori (High Priest)
 Hori (High Priest of Osiris)
 Hori I (Viceroy of Kush)
 Hori I (High Priest of Ptah)
 Hori II (Vizier)
 Hori II (Viceroy of Kush)
 Horkherty
 Hormeni
 Hornakht
 Hornakht (17th Dynasty)
 Hornedjitef
 Horus
 Horus Bird (pharaoh)
 Horus name
 Horus Sa
 Horwennefer
 Hotep
 Hotepibre
 Hotepsekhemwy
 Hounds and jackals
 House of Eternity
 Howard Carter
 Howard Vyse
 Hrere
 Hsekiu
 Hu (mythology)
 Hu, Egypt
 Hudjefa
 Hudjefa I
 Hui (priestess)
 Human–animal hybrid
 Hunefer
 Hunefer (mayor)
 Huni
 Hunters Palette
 Hunting, fishing and animals in ancient Egypt
 Hurbayt
 Huy (High Priest of Ptah)
 Huy (Viceroy of Kush)
 Huya (noble)
 Hydraulic empire
 Hyksos
 Hymn to the Nile
 Hypocephalus
 Hypselis

I 

 I. E. S. Edwards
 Iabet
 Iah
 Iah (queen)
 Ian Shaw (Egyptologist)
 Iaret
 Iat
 Ibi (Egyptian Noble)
 Ibiaw (vizier)
 Idfa
 Idris Bell
 Idu (Ancient Egyptian official)
 Idudju-iker
 Idy (vizier)
 Ihy
 Ihy (vizier)
 Ikhemu-sek
 Ikhernofret
 Ikhernofret Stela
 Ili-Rapih
 Imenmes
 Imentet
 Imhotep
 Imhotep (The Mummy)
 Imhotep Museum
 Imhotep (vizier)
 Imiseba
 Imiut fetish
 Imyremeshaw
 Inaros I
 Inaros II
 Incense burner: arm (hieroglyph)
 Incense burner: pot (hieroglyph)
 Index of Egyptian mythology articles
 Index of Egypt-related articles
 Index of modern Egypt–related articles
 Inebny
 Inebu-hedj
 Inenek-Inti
 Ineni
 Ineni (queen)
 Inetkaes
 Ini (pharaoh)
 Insinger Papyrus
 Installation of the Vizier
 Institut Français d'Archéologie Orientale
 Instructions of Amenemhat
 Instruction of Amenemope
 Instruction of Ankhsheshonq
 Instruction of Any
 Instruction of Hardjedef
 Instructions of Amenemhat
 Instructions of Kagemni
 Intef (general)
 Intef I
 Intef II
 Intef III
 Intef the Elder
 Intefiqer
 Intercalary month
 Inventory Stela
 Inykhnum
 Iollas
 Ipi (vizier)
 Ippolito Rosellini
 Ipu (nurse)
 Ipuki
 Iput
 Iput II
 Ipuwer Papyrus
 Ipy (goddess)
 Ipy (noble)
 Iqer
 Irimayašša
 Irsu
 Iry-Hor
 Iry-pat
 Irynachet
 Isesi-ankh
 Iset (daughter of Amenhotep III)
 Iset (daughter of Thutmose III)
 Iset (queen)
 Iset (priestess)
 Iset Ta-Hemdjert
 Isetemkheb D
 Isetnofret
 Isetnofret (daughter of Khaemwaset)
 Isetnofret II
 Isfet (Egyptian mythology)
 Ishemai
 Isidorus
 Isis
 Ita (princess)
 Itakayt
 Itaweret
 Itet
 Itjtawy
 Iuenka
 Iufaa
 Iufaa (vizier)
 Iufni
 Iuhetibu
 Iuhetibu Fendy
 Iu-miteru
 Iunit
 Iunmin I
 Iunre
 Iuput
 Iuput I
 Iuput II
 Iusaaset
 Iushenshen
 Iuty
 Iuwelot
 Iyibkhentre
 Iymeru (son of Ankhu)
 Iynefer I
 Iynefer II
 Iyri
 Iytjenu
 Izi (Ancient Egyptian official)

J 

 J. Gwyn Griffiths
 Jaffa
 Jar of Xerxes I
 James Henry Breasted
 James Peter Allen
 Jan Assmann
 Jan Potocki
 Janet Gourlay
 Jaroslav Černý (Egyptologist)
 Jean-Baptiste Prosper Jollois
 Jean-François Champollion
 Jean Leclant
 Jean-Philippe Lauer
 Jean Yoyotte
 Jean-Yves Empereur
 Jersey Mummy
 Jiro Kondo
 Joann Fletcher
 Johan David Åkerblad
 Johannes Dümichen
 John Gardner Wilkinson
 John Pendlebury
 John Romer (Egyptologist)
 John Shae Perring
 Joos van Ghistele
 Josef W. Wegner
 Joseph (Genesis)
 Joseph Bonomi the Younger
 Joseph Davidovits
 Joseph Smith Hypocephalus
 Joseph Smith Papyri
 Journal of Egyptian Archaeology
 Journal of the American Research Center in Egypt
 Jozef Vergote
 Juba II
 Jubilee Pavilion (hieroglyph)
 Judicial Papyrus of Turin
 Julius Julianus
 Jürgen von Beckerath
 Juridical Stela

K 

 Ka (pharaoh)
 Ka-Nefer-Nefer
 Ka statue
 Ka statue of king Hor
 Kaaper
 Kadashman-Enlil I
 Kadesh inscriptions
 Kaemsekhem
 Kaemtjenent
 Kafr Ammar
 Kagemni
 Kagemni I
 Kahun Gynaecological Papyrus
 Kahun Papyri
 Kaikhenet (II)
 Kamose
 Kampp 150
 Kampp 161
 Kandake
 Kanefer
 Kanefer (High Priest of Ptah)
 Kapes
 Karanis Site Museum
 Karanog
 Karduniaš
 Karimala
 Karkamani
 Karl Richard Lepsius
 Karnak
 Karnak King List
 Karnak Open Air Museum
 Karomama A
 Karomama I
 Karomama II
 Karomama Meritmut
 Kashta
 Käthe Bosse-Griffiths
 Kawab
 Kay (vizier)
 Kawit (queen)
 Kazimierz Michałowski
 Kebechet
 Kek (mythology)
 Kekheretnebti
 Kemetism
 Keminub
 Kemsit
 Ken-Amun
 Kenneth Kitchen
 Kent R. Weeks
 Kerma
 Kerma culture
 Kerma Museum
 Khaankhre Sobekhotep
 Khaba
 Khabash
 Khabawsokar
 Khabekhnet
 Khaemhat
 Khaemtir
 Khaemwaset (18th dynasty)
 Khaemwaset (20th dynasty)
 Khaemwaset (Nubian official)
 Khaemwaset (Vizier)
 Khaemweset
 Khafre
 Khafre Enthroned
 Khakau (king's son)
 Khakheperraseneb
 Khamerernebty I
 Khamerernebty II
 Khamudi
 Khamure
 Khasekhemwy
 Khaset (nome)
 Khat (apparel)
 Khawy
 Khay (vizier)
 Khay (Nubian official)
 Khayu
 Khedebneithirbinet I
 Khekeret-nisut
 Khendjer
 Khenmet
 Khenemetneferhedjet
 Khenemetneferhedjet I
 Khenemetneferhedjet II
 Khenemetneferhedjet III
 Khenmetptah
 Khensa
 Khensit
 Khentetka
 Khenti-Amentiu
 Khenti-kheti
 Khenthap
 Khentkaus I
 Khentkaus II
 Khentkaus III
 Khenut
 Khepresh
 Khepri
 Kherty
 Kheti (treasurer)
 Kheti (vizier)
 Khety (BH17)
 Khety I (nomarch)
 Khety II (nomarch)
 Khnum
 Khnumhotep and Niankhkhnum
 Khnumhotep I
 Khnumhotep II
 Khnumhotep III
 Khonsu
 Khonsu (TT31)
 Khonsuemheb and the Ghost
 Khopesh
 Khor
 Khormusan
 Khubau
 Khuenre
 Khufu
 Khufukhaf I
 Khufukhaf II
 Khufu ship
 Khufu Statuette
 Khui
 Khuiqer
 Khuit
 Khuit I
 Khuwyptah
 Khuwyt
 Khyan
 Kim Ryholt
 King Neferkare and General Sasenet
 Kingdom of Kush
 King's Highway (ancient)
 Kiosk of Qertassi
 Kiya
 Km (hieroglyph)
 Kmt (magazine)
 Kneph
 Knot (hieroglyph)
 Kohl (cosmetics)
 Koiak
 Kom al-Ahmar Necropolis
 Kom el-Hisn
 Kom el-Nana
 Kom El Sultan
 Kom Firin
 Kom Ombo
 Kothar-wa-Khasis
 Kumma (Nubia)
 Kurna
 Kurt Sethe
 KV1
 KV2
 KV3
 KV4
 KV5
 KV6
 KV7
 KV8
 KV9
 KV10
 KV11
 KV12
 KV13
 KV14
 KV15
 KV16
 KV18
 KV19
 KV20
 KV21
 KV26
 KV27
 KV28
 KV29
 KV30
 KV31
 KV32
 KV33
 KV34
 KV35
 KV36
 KV37
 KV38
 KV39
 KV40
 KV41
 KV42
 KV43
 KV44
 KV45
 KV47
 KV48
 KV49
 KV50
 KV51
 KV52
 KV53
 KV54
 KV55
 KV56
 KV57
 KV58
 KV59
 KV60
 KV61
 KV63
 KV64
 KV65
 Kyphi
 Kyriakos of Makuria

L 

 Labaya
 Labib Habachi
 Lake of fire
 Ladice (Cyrenaean princess)
 Lady of the Lions
 Lady Rai
 Lagus
 Lahun Mathematical Papyri
 Lake Moeris
 Land, irrigated (hieroglyph)
 Land of Goshen
 Land of Manu
 Land of Punt
 Land reform in ancient Egypt
 Laomedon of Mytilene
 Late Egyptian language
 Late Period of ancient Egypt
 Lattice stool
 Layer Pyramid
 Lector priest
 Legs-forward (hieroglyph)
 Leon of Pella
 Leonnatus
 Leontopolis
 Leontopolis (Heliopolis)
 Leopard head (hieroglyph)
 Lepsius I Pyramid
 Lepsius L
 Lepsius list of pyramids
 Lepsius XXIV
 Lepidotonpolis
 Letters to the dead
 Letopolis
 Library of Alexandria
 Libu
 Libyan Palette
 Lighthouse of Alexandria
 Lisht
 Litany of Re
 Litany of the Eye of Horus
 London Medical Papyrus
 Lotiform vessels
 Lotus chalice
 Louvre Pyramid
 Lower Egypt
 Lower Nubia
 Loyalist Teaching
 Lucius Laberius Maximus
 Lucius Lusius Geta
 Lucius Seius Strabo
 Lucius Volusius Maecianus
 Ludwig Borchardt
 Luigi Vassalli
 Lunette (stele)
 Luxor
 Luxor Museum
 Luxor Obelisks
 Luxor statue cache
 Luxor Temple
 Libyan Palette
 Lycopolis (Delta)
 Lyla Pinch Brock
 Lysandra
 Lysimachus

M 

 Maahes
 Maat
 Maa Kheru
 Maathorneferure
 Maatkare B
 Maatkare Mutemhat
 MacGregor plaque
 Machimoi
 Mafdet
 Magas of Cyrene
 Mahat chapel of Mentuhotep II
 Mahu (noble)
 Mahu (official)
 Maia (nurse)
 Maiherpri
 Malaqaye
 Malewiebamani
 Malkata
 Malqata Menat
 Mammisi
 Mandulis
 Manetho
 Manfred Bietak
 Man-prisoner (hieroglyph)
 Man-seated: arms in adoration (hieroglyph)
 Manshiyat Ezzat
 Manshiyat Ezzat Palette
 Manuel de Codage
 Margaret Benson
 Margaret Murray
 Marcus Junius Rufus
 Marcus Petronius Mamertinus
 Marcus Rutilius Lupus
 Mark Antony
 Mark Lehner
 Markos of Makuria
 Maru-Aten
 Maryannu
 Masaharta
 Mask of Tutankhamun
 Mast (hieroglyph)
 Mastaba
 Mastaba of Hesy-Re
 Mastaba of Kaninisut
 Mastaba of Seshemnefer
 Mastaba S3503
 Mastaba S3504
 Mastabat al-Fir'aun
 Mathematics in Ancient Egypt: A Contextual History
 May (noble)
 May (governor)
 Maya (treasurer)
 Maya (High Priest of Amun)
 Mayer Papyri
 Mayet (ancient Egypt)
 Mazaces
 Mazghuna
 Measuring rod
 Medamud
 Medical Ostraca of Deir el-Medina
 Medinet Habu
 Medinet Habu king list
 Medinet Madi
 Medius of Larissa
 Medjay
 Medjed
 Medjed (fish)
 Medunefer
 Mehen
 Mehen (game)
 Mehet-Weret
 Mehit
 Mehytenweskhet
 Mehu
 Meidum
 Meir, Egypt
 Meketaten
 Meketre
 Mekh
 Meleager (general)
 Mémoires sur l'Égypte
 Memphis, Egypt
 Memphite Formula
 Memphite Necropolis
 Menander (general)
 Menat
 Mendes
 Menedemus (general)
 Menelaus (son of Lagus)
 Menes
 Menet (princess)
 Menhet, Menwi and Merti
 Menhit
 Menka (queen)
 Menkare
 Menkauhor Kaiu
 Menkaure
 Menkheperre
 Menkheperre (name)
 Menkheperre (prince)
 Menkheperraseneb I
 Menkheperreseneb II
 Menna
 Menouf
 Menouthis
 Mentuemhat
 Mentuherkhepeshef (son of Ramesses IX)
 Mentuhotep I
 Mentuhotep II
 Mentuhotep III
 Mentuhotep IV
 Mentuhotep (god's father)
 Mentuhotep (queen)
 Mentuhotep (treasurer)
 Merankhre Mentuhotep
 Merdjefare
 Merefnebef
 Merenhor
 Merenptah (prince)
 Merenre Nemtyemsaf I
 Merenre Nemtyemsaf II
 Mereruka
 Meresamun
 Meresankh I
 Meresankh II
 Meresankh III
 Meresankh IV
 Meret
 Mereret (12th Dynasty)
 Meret-Isesi
 Meretnebty
 Meretseger
 Meretseger (queen)
 Merhotepre Ini
 Merhotepre Sobekhotep
 Meriiti
 Merikare
 Merimde culture
 Meritamen
 Meritaten
 Meritaten Tasherit
 Meriiti
 Meritites
 Meritites I
 Meritites II
 Meritites IV
 Merit-Ptah
 Merkare
 Merkawre Sobekhotep
 Merkheperre
 Merkhet
 Merkurios of Makuria
 Merneferre Ay
 Merneith
 Merneptah
 Merneptah Stele
 Meroë
 Mersekhemre Ined
 Mershepsesre Ini II
 Meru (overseer of sealers)
 Mervat Seif el-Din
 Mery (High Priest of Amun)
 Mery (High Priest of Osiris)
 Meryatum
 Meryatum II
 Meryhathor
 Meryibre Khety
 Merymose
 Meryneith
 Meryptah
 Meryptah (high priest of Ptah)
 Meryre
 Meryre (treasurer)
 Meryre II
 Merysekhmet
 Meryteti
 ̈Merytre
 Merytre-Hatshepsut
 Mesehti
 Mesen-ka
 Meshir
 Meshwesh
 Meskhenet
 Mesori
 Metjen
 Metternich Stela
 Michał Tyszkiewicz (Egyptologist)
 Middle Egyptian: An Introduction to the Language and Culture of Hieroglyphs
 Middle Kingdom of Egypt
 Milan Papyrus
 Military of ancient Egypt
 Milkilu
 Min (god)
 Min festival
 Min Palette
 Min (treasurer)
 Mindjedef
 Minemhat
 Mining industry of Egypt
 Ministry of Tourism and Antiquities (Egypt)
 Minkhaf I
 Minmontu
 Minmose
 Minmose (High Priest)
 Minmose (overseer of granaries)
 Minmose (overseer of works)
 Minnefer
 Minnefer (vizier)
 Minoan frescoes from Tell el-Dab'a
 Minor tombs in the Valley of the Kings
 Minya, Egypt
 Mirgissa
 Miriam
 Miriam Lichtheim
 Miroslav Verner
 Mithrenes
 Mithridates (Persian general)
 MMA 56
 MMA 57
 MMA 59
 MMA 60
 MMA 507
 MMA 729
 MMA Tombs
 Mnevis
 Modius (headdress)
 Montu
 Montuherkhopshef (son of Ramesses III)
 Mortuary temple
 Mortuary Temple of Amenhotep III
 Mortuary Temple of Hatshepsut
 Mortuary Temple of Seti I
 Moscow Mathematical Papyrus
 Mose (Ancient Egyptian official)
 Mose (scribe)
 Moses
 Mummies: A Voyage Through Eternity
 Mummification Museum
 Mummy
 Musaeum
 Museo Egizio
 Mut
 Mutbaal
 Mutbenret
 Mutemwiya
 Muthis
 Mutnedjmet
 Mutnedjmet
 Mutnofret
 Myos Hormos
 Mysteries of Isis
 Mythographus Homericus

N 

 Nabta Playa
 Naguib Kanawati
 Naharin
 Nakht
 Nakht (BH21)
 Nakht (high steward)
 Nakhtmin
 Nakhtmin (charioteer)
 Nakhtmin (scribe)
 Nakhtmin (troop commander)
 Nakhtneith
 Nakhtpaaten
 Nakhtubasterau
 Nakhy
 Naos (hieroglyph)
 Naparaye
 Napata
 Naqa
 Naqada
 Naqada culture
 Naqada III
 Narmer
 Narmer Macehead
 Narmer Palette
 Nasakhma
 Nasalsa
 Nasekheperensekhmet
 Nash Papyrus
 Nastasen
 Natacha Rambova
 Natakamani
 Naucratis
 Nauny
 Naziba
 Nearchus
 Nebamun
 Nebankh
 Nebdjefare
 Nebemakhet
 Nebet
 Nebet (queen)
 Nebetah
 Nebethetepet
 Nebetia
 Nebetiunet
 Nebetnehat
 Nebettawy
 Nebiryraw I
 Nebiryraw II
 Nebit
 Nebka
 Nebkaure Khety
 Nebmaatre
 Nebmaatre (prince)
 Nebneteru Tenry
 Nebpu
 Nebra (pharaoh)
 Nebsemi
 Nebsenre
 Nebtu
 Nebtuwi
 Nebty name
 Nebty-tepites
 Nebu
 Nebwawy
 Nebwenenef
 Necho I
 Necho II
 Nectanebo I
 Nectanebo II
 Nedjeftet
 Nedjem
 Nedjemibre
 Nefer
 Neferefre
 Neferhetepes
 Neferhotep (scribe of the great enclosure)
 Neferhotep I
 Neferhotep III
 Neferirkare
 Neferirkare Kakai
 Neferitatjenen
 Neferka
 Neferkahor
 Neferkamin
 Neferkamin Anu
 Neferkara I
 Neferkare II
 Neferkare VIII
 Neferkare Khendu
 Neferkare Iymeru
 Neferkare Neby
 Neferkare (9th dynasty)
 Neferkare Pepiseneb
 Neferkare Tereru
 Neferkare (Tanis)
 Neferkasokar
 Neferkauhor
 Neferkaure
 Neferkheperu-her-sekheper
 Nefermaat
 Nefermaat II
 Neferneferuaten
 Neferneferuaten Tasherit
 Neferneferure
 Nefersheshemre
 Nefertari
 Nefertari (18th dynasty)
 Nefertem
 Neferthenut
 Nefertiabet
 Nefertiti
 Nefertiti Bust
 Nefertkau I
 Nefertkau II
 Nefertkau III
 Neferu I
 Neferu II
 Neferu III
 Neferukayet
 Neferuptah
 Neferure
 Neferweben 
 Nefrubity
 Nefrusy
 Neheb
 Nehebkau
 Nehi (Viceroy of Kush)
 Nehesy
 Nehmes Bastet
 Nehmetawy
 Nehsi
 Neith
 Neith (wife of Pepi II)
 Neithhotep
 Nekauba
 Nekhbet
 Nekhen
 Nekhen (nome)
 Nemes
 Nemty
 Neni
 Neoptolemus (general)
 Neper (mythology)
 Nepherites I
 Nepherites II
 Nephthys
 Nerikare
 Neserkauhor
 Neshmet
 Nesitanebetashru
 Nesitaudjatakhet
 Neskhons
 Nespamedu
 Nespaqashuty C
 Nestor L'Hôte
 Nesyamun
 Neterkheperre Meryptah called Pipi II
 Netjeraperef
 Netjerkare Siptah
 Netjernakht
 Neues Museum
 Newborn calf (hieroglyph)
 New Chronology (Rohl)
 New Kalabsha
 New Kingdom of Egypt
 New Wadi es-Sebua
 New Year's Bottle
 Niankhba
 Nicanor (son of Parmenion)
 Nicholas Reeves
 Night (hieroglyph)
 Nikare
 Nikare II
 Nikaure
 Nile: An Ancient Egyptian Quest
 Nile Level Texts
 Nile mosaic of Palestrina
 Nilometer
 Nilotic landscape
 Nilus (mythology)
 Nimaathap
 Nimaethap II
 Nimlot A
 Nimlot B
 Nimlot C
 Nimlot of Hermopolis
 Ni-Neith
 Nine bows
 Nineteenth Dynasty of Egypt
 Nineteenth Dynasty of Egypt family tree
 Ninth Dynasty of Egypt
 Niqmaddu II
 Nisuheqet
 Nitocris
 Nitocris I (Divine Adoratrice)
 Nitocris II
 Nodjmet
 Nofret
 Nofret (13th Dynasty queen)
 Nomarch
 Nome (country subdivision)
 Nomen (ancient Egypt)
 Nomos of Harawî
 Norea
 Northampton Sekhemka statue
 North Asasif
 North City, Amarna
 North Riverside Palace
 Northern Mazghuna pyramid
 Northern Palace (Amarna)
 Nu (mythology)
 Nubayrah Stele
 Nubemhat
 Nubhetepti
 Nubhetepti-khered
 Nubia
 Nubian pyramids
 Nubian wig
 Nubkhaes
 Nubkheperre Intef
 Nubkhesbed
 Nubnefer
 Nubwenet
 Nuit
 Numbers in Egyptian mythology
 Nut (goddess)
 Nuya
 Ny-Hor
 Nyibunesu
 Nykara
 Nynetjer
 Nyuserre Ini

O 

 Obelisk
 Obelisk (hieroglyph)
 Obelisk ship
 Obelisks of Nectanebo II
 Oedipus Aegyptiacus
 Ogdoad (Egyptian)
 Ola El Aguizy
 Olbia (Egypt)
 Old Kingdom of Egypt
 Olympiodorus of Thebes
 Onomasticon of Amenope
 Opening of the mouth ceremony
 Opet Festival
 Oracle of the Lamb
 Oracle of the Potter
 Orly Goldwasser
 Orontobates
 Oryx nome
 Osarseph
 Osireion
 Osirica
 Osiris
 Osiris myth
 Osorkon Bust
 Osorkon I
 Osorkon II
 Osorkon III
 Osorkon IV
 Osorkon C
 Osorkon the Elder
 Ostracon
 Ostracon of Prince Sethherkhepshef
 Ostracon of Senemut
 Ostrakine
 Otto Schaden
 Ouroboros
 Outline of ancient Egypt
 Overseer of Fields
 Overseer of the treasuries
 Overseer of Upper Egypt
 Oxford Encyclopedia of Ancient Egypt
 Oxyartes
 Oxyrhynchus
 Oxyrhynchus Papyri
 Ozymandias

P 

 Paatenemheb
 Pabasa
 Pachnamunis
 Paddle doll
 Padiamenope
 Padiiset's Statue
 Paenniut
 Pahemnetjer
 Pahura
 Painting of Lady Tjepu
 Pakhet
 Palermo Stone
 Palmette
 Pami
 Paneb
 Panehesy
 Panehesy (vizier)
 Panehsy (TT16)
 Pantjeny
 Paopi
 Pap. Ambras
 Papyrology
 Papyrus
 Papyrus Anastasi I
 Papyrus Boulaq 18
 Papyrus Brooklyn 35.1446
 Papyrus Golénischeff
 Papyrus Harris 500
 Papyrus Harris I
 Papyrus Hood
 Papyrus Lansing
 Papyrus Leopold II
 Papyrus of Ani
 Papyrus roll-tied
 Papyrus Salt 124
 Papyrus stem (hieroglyph)
 Paraemheb
 Pareherwenemef
 Pareherwenemef (20th dynasty)
 Paremhat
 Parennefer called Wennefer
 Parennefer
 Parmenion
 Parmenion (architect)
 Parmouti
 Paser I
 Paser II
 Paser Crossword Stela
 Paser (mayor under Ramses III)
 Paser (vizier)
 Pasherienptah III
 Pashedu
 Pashons
 Patareshnes
 Pathros
 Pausanias of Orestis
 Paweraa
 Pawura
 Payeftjauemawyneith
 Pebatjma
 Pebekkamen
 Pediese
 Pediese, chief of the Ma
 Pedubast I
 Pedubast II
 Pedubast (high steward)
 Peftjauawybast
 Pehen-Ptah
 Pehenuikai
 Pehernefer
 Peithon
 Peithon (son of Agenor)
 Peksater
 Pelusium
 Penamun
 Penebui
 Pennesuttawy
 Penre
 Pensekhmet
 Pentawer
 Penthelia
 Penthu
 Pentu
 Pepi I Meryre
 Pepi II Neferkare
 Pepi III
 Percy Newberry
 Perdiccas
 Periodization of ancient Egypt
 Perit (goddess)
 Perneb
 Persenet
 Per-Wadjet (Upper Egypt)
 Peru-nefer
 Peseshet
 Petbe
 Peter Dorman
 Peter J. Brand
 Petiese
 Petosiris
 Petubastis III
 Peucestas
 Pharaoh
 Pharaoh-seated, with flail & red crown (hieroglyph)
 Pharaohs in the Bible
 Pharaonic Tayma inscription
 Pharaonism
 Pharnabazus II
 Pharnabazus III
 Pharnuches of Lycia
 Pherendates
 Pherendates II
 Phernouphis
 Pheron
 Philae temple complex
 Philae obelisk
 Philagrius (prefect of Egypt)
 Philistines
 Philitas of Cos
 Philo
 Philotas
 Philotas (satrap)
 Philoteris
 Philoxenus (general)
 Phrataphernes
 Piankh
 Pick (hieroglyph)
 Pierre Lacau
 Pierre Louis Jean Casimir de Blacas
 Pierre Montet
 Pi-HaHiroth
 Pihuri
 Pimay
 Pinakes
 Pinedjem I
 Pinedjem II
 Pinehesy
 Pipi A
 Pi-Ramesses
 Pirissi and Tulubri
 Pi-Sekhemkheperre
 Pítati
 Pithom
 Piye
 Plummet amulet
 Polyperchon
 Pomponius Januarianus
 Portraiture in ancient Egypt
 Potasimto
 Pothinus
 Potipherah
 Pr (hieroglyph)
 Praise of the Two Lands (ship)
 Prayers of Pahery
 Precinct of Amun-Re
 Precinct of Montu
 Precinct of Mut
 Prehistoric Egypt
 Prehotep I
 Prehotep II
 Prenomen (Ancient Egypt)
 Priestess of Hathor
 Prince Rahotep
 Princess Khamerernebty
 Princess Khentkaus
 Prisse Papyrus
 Prophecy of Neferti
 Prostration formula
 Proteus of Egypt
 Prudhoe Lions
 Psammetichus IV
 Psammuthes
 Psamtik I
 Psamtik II
 Psamtik III
 Psamtikseneb
 Pschent
 Psusennes I
 Psusennes II
 Psusennes III
 Ptah
 Ptah-Du-Auu
 Ptahemhat called Ty
 Ptahemwia
 Ptahhotep
 Ptahhotep Desher
 Ptahhotep (Djedkare)
 Ptahhotep Tjefi
 Ptahmose I (High Priest of Ptah)
 Ptahmose II (High Priest of Ptah)
 Ptahmose, son of Menkheper
 Ptahmose, son of Thutmose
 Ptahmose (treasurer)
 Ptahmose (vizier)
 Ptahshepses
 Ptahshepses (high priest)
 Ptolemaic army
 Ptolemaic coinage
 Ptolemaic cult of Alexander the Great
 Ptolemaic decrees
 Ptolemaic dynasty
 Ptolemaic Kingdom
 Ptolemaic navy
 Ptolemy I Soter
 Ptolemy II Philadelphus
 Ptolemy III Euergetes
 Ptolemy IV Philopator
 Ptolemy V Epiphanes
 Ptolemy VI Philometor
 Ptolemy VII Neos Philopator
 Ptolemy VIII Physcon
 Ptolemy IX Soter
 Ptolemy X Alexander I
 Ptolemy XI Alexander II
 Ptolemy XII Auletes
 Ptolemy XIII Theos Philopator
 Ptolemy XIV Philopator
 Ptolemy XV Caesar
 Ptolemy (son of Seleucus)
 Ptolemy Apion
 Ptolemy Ceraunus
 Ptolemy Eupator
 Ptolemy of Mauretania
 Ptolemy Philadelphus (son of Cleopatra)
 Pu-Ba'lu
 Pyhia
 Puimre
 Put (biblical figure)
 Pylon (architecture)
 Pyramid G1-a
 Pyramid G1-b
 Pyramid G1-c
 Pyramid G1-d
 Pyramid G2-a
 Pyramid G3-a
 Pyramid G3-b
 Pyramid G3-c
 Pyramid inch
 Pyramid of Ahmose
 Pyramid of Amenemhat III (Dahshur)
 Pyramid of Amenemhat I
 Pyramid of Ameny Qemau
 Pyramid of Athribis
 Pyramid of Djedefre
 Pyramid of Djedkare Isesi
 Pyramid of Djoser
 Pyramid of Elephantine
 Pyramid of Ity
 Pyramid of Khafre
 Pyramid of Khendjer
 Pyramid of Khentkaus I
 Pyramid of Khui
 Pyramid of Menkaure
 Pyramid of Merenre
 Pyramid of Merikare
 Pyramid of Naqada
 Pyramid of Neferefre
 Pyramid of Neferirkare
 Pyramid of Neferkare Neby
 Pyramid of Nyuserre
 Pyramid of Pepi I
 Pyramid of Pepi II
 Pyramid of Reherishefnakht
 Pyramid of Sahure
 Pyramid of Seila
 Pyramid of Senusret I
 Pyramid of Senusret II
 Pyramid of Senusret III
 Pyramid of Teti
 Pyramid of Unas
 Pyramid of Userkaf
 Pyramid Texts
 Pyramidion
 Pyramidion of Amenemhat III
 Pyramidology
 The Pyramids of Giza: Facts, Legends and Mysteries
 Pyramids of Meroë

Q 

 Qa'a
 Qahedjet
 Qakare Ibi
 Qakare Ini
 Qalhata
 Qar (Ancient Egyptian official)
 Qar (doctor)
 Qar (vizier)
 Qareh Khawoserre
 Qasr Ibrim
 Qebui
 Qed-her
 Qen
 Qeni
 Qenna
 Qetesh
 Qift
 Quadrat (hieroglyph block)
 Quay with Sphinxes
 Qubbet el-Hawa
 Queen of Heaven (antiquity)
 Qurnet Murai
 Qus
 Qustul
 QV44
 QV60
 QV68
 QV71
 QV75
 QV80

R 

 R. A. Schwaller de Lubicz
 Ra
 Radiate crown
 Raemka
 Raet-Tawy
 Rafael of Makuria
 Raherka and Meresankh
 Rahonem
 Rahotep
 Ramesses (prince)
 Ramesses I
 Ramesses II
 Ramesses III
 Ramesses III prisoner tiles
 Ramesses IV
 Ramesses V
 Ramesses VI
 Ramesses VII
 Ramesses VIII
 Ramesses IX
 Ramesses IX Tomb-plan Ostracon
 Ramesses X
 Ramesses XI
 Ramesses-Meryamun-Nebweben
 Ramessesnakht
 Ramesseum
 Ramesseum medical papyri
 Ramesseum king list
 Ramesseum magician's box
 Ramesside star clocks
 Ramose
 Ramose (18th Dynasty)
 Ramose (prince)
 Ramose (TT55)
 Ramose (TT7)
 Ramose and Hatnofer
 Ramushenti
 Ranefer
 Ranefer (High Priest of Ptah)
 Raphia Decree
 Rashepses
 Rawer (5th Dynasty)
 Rawer (vizier)
 Raymond O. Faulkner
 Reading Egyptian Art
 Reanap
 Red auxiliary number
 Red Pyramid
 Rededjet
 Regalia of the Pharaoh
 Reginald Engelbach
 Rehuerdjersen
 Reign of Cleopatra
 Reisner Papyrus
 Rekhetre
 Rekhmire
 Relief of Gebel Sheikh Suleiman
 Rem (mythology)
 Renée Friedman
 Renenutet
 Renpet
 Renpetneferet
 Renseneb
 Reptynub
 Repyt
 Reserve head
 Resheph
 Resseneb (son of Ankhu)
 Retjenu
 Revenge of the Mummy
 Revue d'Égyptologie
 Rhind Mathematical Papyrus
 Rhind Mathematical Papyrus 2/n table
 Rhinocorura
 Rhodopis
 Rhodopis (hetaera)
 Rib-Hadda
 Herbert Ricke
 Herbert Eustis Winlock
 Rifeh
 Rishi coffin
 River God
 Road (hieroglyph)
 Robert Hay (Egyptologist)
 Robert Morkot
 Roemer- und Pelizaeus-Museum Hildesheim
 Roma called Roy
 Roman Egypt
 Roman pharaoh
 Rope stretcher
 Rosetta Stone
 Rosetta Stone decree
 Rosicrucian Egyptian Museum
 Roxana
 Royal Cache
 Royal Tomb of Akhenaten
 Royal Wadi and tombs
 Rubutu
 Rudamun
 Ruiu
 Rylands Papyri

S 

 S 9 (Abydos)
 S 10 (Abydos)
 Sabaces
 Sabef
 Sabni
 Sabu also called Ibebi
 Sabu also called Kem
 Sabu also called Tjety
 Sack of Thebes
 Sadeh (queen)
 Saft el-Hinna
 Sah (god)
 Sahure
 Saï (island)
 Sail (hieroglyph)
 Sais, Egypt
 Saite Oracle Papyrus
 Sakha, Egypt
 SAK S 3
 Sakir-Har
 Sakuji Yoshimura
 Salima Ikram
 Salitis
 Salomo of Makuria
 Samannud
 Samuel Birch
 Sanakht
 Sandal-bearer
 Sankhenre Sewadjtu
 Saqiyah
 Saqqara
 Saqqara Bird
 Saqqara ostracon
 Saqqara Tablet
 Sara Yorke Stevenson
 Sarah Israelit Groll
 Sarah Parcak
 Sarcophagus
 Sarcophagus of Seti I
 Sarenput I
 Sarenput II
 Sasobek
 Satatna
 Satiah
 Satibarzanes
 Satis (goddess)
 Šatiya
 Satkhnum
 Satsobek
 Sayala Mace
 ScanPyramids
 Scarab (artifact)
 Scarab ring
 Schoenus
 Scorpion I
 Scorpion II
 Scorpion Macehead
 Scribe equipment (hieroglyph)
 Sea Peoples
 Seankhenre Mentuhotepi
 Seankhibtawy Seankhibra
 The Search for Ancient Egypt
 Season of the Emergence
 Season of the Harvest
 Season of the Inundation
 Sebakh
 Sebat (king's daughter)
 Sebayt
 Sebek-khu Stele
 Sebiumeker
 Sebkay
 Second Dynasty of Egypt
 Second Intermediate Period of Egypt
 Second Prophet of Amun
 Sed festival
 Sedjefakare
 Sedjemnetjeru
 Sedjes
 Sedment
 Sega (Upper Egypt)
 Segerseni
 Sehebre
 Sehener
 Sehel Island
 Seheqenre Sankhptahi
 Sehetepibre
 Sehetepebreankh-nedjem
 Sehetepkare Intef
 Seked
 Seker
 Sekhem-ankh-Ptah
 Sekhem scepter
 Sekhemib-Perenmaat
 Sekhemkare
 Sekhemkare (vizier)
 Sekhemkhet
 Sekhemre-Heruhirmaat Intef
 Sekhemrekhutawy Khabaw
 Sekhemre Khutawy Sobekhotep
 Sekhemre Shedwast
 Sekhemre-Wepmaat Intef
 Sekheperenre
 Sekhmet
 Sekhmet statues
 Seleucus I Nicator
 Selim Hassan
 Semat
 Sematawytefnakht
 Sememiah
 Semenkare Nebnuni
 Semenre
 Semerkhet
 Semna (Nubia)
 Semna Despatches
 Semqen
 Senakhtenre Ahmose
 Senankh
 Senbuy
 Seneb
 Seneb (king's son)
 Senebhenaf
 Senebhenas
 Senebi
 Senebkay
 Senebsumai
 Senebtisi
 Senedj
 Senedjemib Inti
 Senedjemib Mehi
 Senenmut
 Senet
 Senet (queen)
 Senewosret-Ankh
 Senewosret-Ankh (vizier)
 Seni
 Senkamanisken
 Sennedjem
 Sennedjem (18th Dynasty)
 Sennefer
 Sennefer (Deir el-Medineh)
 Sennefer (treasurer)
 Senetsenebtysy
 Senimen
 Senseneb
 Senusret I
 Senusret II
 Senusret III
 Senusret IV
 Senusret (nomarch)
 Senusret (vizier)
 Sepa (priest)
 Sepermeru
 Seqenenre Tao
 Sequence dating
 Serabit el-Khadim
 Serapeum of Alexandria
 Serapeum of Saqqara
 Serapis
 Serdab
 Serekh
 Serethor
 Sergio Donadoni
 Serket
 Serpopard
 Servant in the Place of Truth
 Sesenebnef
 Seshat
 Seshathetep
 Seshemetka
 Seshemnefer (III)
 Sesheshet
 Sesostris
 Set (deity)
 Set animal
 Setau
 Setepenre
 Setepenre (princess)
 Seth Meribre
 Seth-Peribsen
 Seti I
 Seti II
 Seti (commander)
 Seti (Viceroy of Kush)
 Seti-Merenptah
 Setibhor
 Setka (prince)
 Setnakhte
 Setne Khamwas and Si-Osire
 Setut
 Seventeenth Dynasty of Egypt
 Seventh Dynasty of Egypt
 Sewadjkare
 Sewadjkare III
 Sewadjkare Hori
 Sewadjare Mentuhotep
 Sewahenre Senebmiu
 Sha-Amun-en-su
 Shabaka
 Shabaka Stone
 Shadoof
 Shai
 Shait
 Shalfak
 Shanakdakhete
 Sharek
 Sharuhen
 Sharuna
 Shasu
 Shebitku
 Shed (deity)
 Shedeh
 Shedsu-nefertum
 Sheikh Abd el-Qurna
 Sheikh Abd el-Qurna cache
 Sheikh Muftah culture
 Shellal
 Shemay
 Shendyt
 Shen ring
 Sheneh (pharaoh)
 Shenshek
 Shepenupet I
 Shepenupet II
 Shepseskaf
 Shepseskaf-ankh
 Shepseskare
 Shepset-ipet
 Sherden
 Sheretnebty
 Shery (Egypt)
 Sheshi
 Shesmetet
 Shezmu
 Shishak
 Shorkaror
 Shoshenq
 Shoshenq I
 Shoshenq II
 Shoshenq III
 Shoshenq IV
 Shoshenq V
 Shoshenq VI
 Shoshenq VII
 Shoshenq A
 Shoshenq C
 Shoshenq D
 Shu (Egyptian god)
 Shunet El Zebib
 Shuroy
 Shuti hieroglyph (two-feather adornment)
 Sia (god)
 Siamun
 Siamun (son of Ahmose I)
 Siamun (son of Thutmose III)
 Siaspiqa
 Siatum
 Side, Turkey
 Sidelock of youth
 Siege of Alexandria (47 BC)
 Siege of Dapur
 Siese
 Siese the Elder
 Siese the Younger
 Sihathor
 Silvio Curto
 Simmias of Macedon
 Simon of Makuria
 Simut
 Siptah
 Sir Herbert Thompson Professor of Egyptology
 Sirius
 Sistrum
 Sitamun
 Sitdjehuti
 Sithathor
 Sithathoriunet
 Sitre
 Sitre In
 Sixteenth Dynasty of Egypt
 Sixth Dynasty of Egypt
 Sky (hieroglyph)
 Slavery in ancient Egypt
 Small Aten Temple
 Smendes
 Smendes II
 Smendes III
 Smenkhkare
 Smiting-blade symbol (hieroglyph)
 Snaaib
 Sneferka
 Sneferu
 Sneferukhaf
 Soba (city)
 Sobek
 Sobekemhat
 Sobekemsaf I
 Sobekemsaf II
 Sobekemsaf (13th Dynasty)
 Sobekhotep III
 Sobekhotep IV
 Sobekhotep VI
 Sobekhotep VIII
 Sobekemsaf (queen)
 Sobekhotep (treasurer)
 Sobekhotep (mayor of the Faiyum)
 Sobekhotep (New Kingdom treasurer)
 Sobeknakht I
 Sobeknakht II
 Sobeknakht (high steward)
 Sobeknakht (king's daughter)
 Sobekneferu
 Sobkou Planitia
 Sogdianus
 Solar barque
 Somers Clarke
 Sonbef
 Sonchis of Sais
 Sopdet
 Sopdu
 Sothic cycle
 Soul house
 Souls of Pe and Nekhen
 Sources and parallels of the Exodus
 South Saqqara Stone
 South Tombs Cemetery, Amarna
 Southern Mazghuna pyramid
 Southern South Saqqara pyramid
 Southern Tomb 11
 Southern Tomb 23
 Southern Tomb 25
 Spell of the Twelve Caves
 Speos Artemidos
 Sphinx
 Sphinx of Memphis
 Sphinx of Taharqo
 Sphinx water erosion hypothesis
 Spine with fluid (hieroglyph)
 Spitamenes
 Spithridates
 Stair-single (hieroglyph)
 Standard Theory (Egyptology)
 Star shaft
 Statue of Amenemhat III (Berlin)
 Statue of Horemheb and Amenia
 Statue of Metjen
 Statue of official Bes
 Statue of Ramesses II
 Statue of Sekhmet
 Statue of Sobekneferu
 Statues of Amun in the form of a ram protecting King Taharqa
 Statuette of Neferefre
 Statuette of the lady Tiye
 Stela of Akhenaten and his family
 Stela of Pasenhor
 Stela of Queen Tetisheri
 Stelae of Nahr el-Kalb
 Stele
 Stele of Ankh-ef-en-Khonsu
 Step pyramid
 Stephen Glanville
 Stick shabti
 Stolist
 Stone quarries of ancient Egypt
 Stork (pharaoh)
 Story of Sinuhe
 Story of Wenamun
 Stuart Tyson Smith
 Studien zur Altägyptischen Kultur
 Subartu
 Suez inscriptions of Darius the Great
 Sumenu
 Sumur (Levant)
 Sun (hieroglyph)
 Sun-rising (hieroglyph)
 Sun Temple of Userkaf
 Supreme Council of Antiquities
 Šuta
 Suty
 Šuwardata
 Swallow (hieroglyph)
 Syrian Wars

T 

 T (hieroglyph)
 Tabekenamun
 Tabiry
 Ta-Bitjet
 Tadeusz Andrzejewski
 Tadeusz Samuel Smoleński
 Tadibast III
 Tadukhipa
 Taemwadjsy
 Tagi of Ginti
 Taharqa
 Tahmašši
 Tahpanhes
 Tahpenes
 Tahtib
 Taimhotep
 Takabuti
 Takahatenamun
 Takelot I
 Takelot II
 Takelot III
 Takhat
 Takhat (20th dynasty)
 Takhuit
 Talatat
 Tale of the Doomed Prince
 Tale of the Shipwrecked Sailor
 Tale of Two Brothers
 Tale of Woe
 Tanedjemet
 Tanis
 Tantamani
 Tarekeniwal
 Tarkhan
 Tarkhan dress
 Tarrana
 Ta-Seti
 Tashedkhonsu
 Tasian culture
 Tatenen
 Tati (queen)
 Ta-wer
 Taweret
 Tawerettenru
 Tay (treasurer)
 Tayt
 Tchaenhotep
 Teaching for King Merykara
 Tebtunis
 Tebtunis archive
 Tefibi
 Tefnakht
 Tefnakht II
 Tefnut
 Tell el-Dab'a
 Tel Habuwa
 Tell el-Balamun
 Tell el-Yahudiyeh Ware
 Tem (queen)
 Tempest Stele
 Temple of Aksha
 Temple of Amada
 Temple of Amenhotep IV
 Temple of Beit el-Wali
 Temple of Dakka
 Temple of Debod
 Temple of Dendur
 Temple of Derr
 Temple of Edfu
 Temple of Ellesyia
 Temple of Ezbet Rushdi
 Temple of Gerf Hussein
 Temple of Hibis
 Temple of Kalabsha
 Temple of Khonsu
 Temple of Kom Ombo
 Temple of Maharraqa
 Temple of Montu (Medamud)
 Temple of Mut, Jebel Barkal
 Temple of Ptah (Karnak)
 Temple of Satet
 Temple of Seti I (Abydos)
 Temple of Taffeh
 Temple of Thutmose III
 Temples of Wadi es-Sebua
 Tentamun (18th dynasty)
 Tentamun (20th dynasty)
 Tentamun (21st dynasty)
 Tenth Dynasty of Egypt
 Tentkheta
 Teos of Egypt
 Teqorideamani
 T. Eric Peet
 Tessarakonteres
 Teti
 Teti, Son of Minhotep
 Teti (vizier)
 Tetiankhkem
 Tetisheri
 Teucer of Babylon
 Tey
 Thalamegos
 Thamphthis
 Tharbis
 The Adler Papyri
 The Anabasis of Alexander
 The Blinding of Truth by Falsehood
 The Contendings of Horus and Seth
 The Eloquent Peasant
 The Greatest Pharaohs
 The Immortality of Writers
 The Indestructibles
 The Land of Foam
 The lion hunts of Amenhotep III during the first ten years of his reign
 The Maxims of Ptahhotep
 The Mummy (1932 film)
 The Mummy (1959 film)
 The Mummy (1999 film)
 The Mummy Returns
 The Mummy's Ghost
 The Mummy's Hand
 The Mummy's Tomb
 The Prince of Egypt
 The Quarrel of Apophis and Seqenenre
 The Ritual of Embalming Papyrus
 The Satire of the Trades
 The Scorpion King
 The Seated Scribe
 The Seven Hills
 The Starving of Saqqara
 The Stonemason Ostracon
 The Taking of Joppa
 The Younger Lady
 Thebaid
 Theban Mapping Project
 Theban Necropolis
 Theban Triad
 Thebes, Egypt
 Theodore M. Davis
 Théodule Devéria
 Thesh
 Thessalonike of Macedon
 Thinis
 Thinite Confederacy
 Third Dynasty of Egypt
 Third Intermediate Period of Egypt
 Thirteenth Dynasty of Egypt
 Thirtieth Dynasty of Egypt
 Thirty-first Dynasty of Egypt
 Thmuis
 Thomas Schneider (Egyptologist)
 Thomas Young (scientist)
 Thoth
 Thout
 Throne of Princess Sitamun
 Throw stick (hieroglyph)
 Thutmose
 Thutmose I
 Thutmose II
 Thutmose III
 Thutmose IV
 Thutmose (prince)
 Thutmose (sculptor)
 Thutmose (18th-dynasty vizier)
 Thutmose (19th-dynasty vizier)
 Thuya
 Tia (overseer of treasury)
 Tia (princess)
 Tiaa
 Tiaa (princess)
 Tiaa (wife of Seti II)
 Tiberius Julius Alexander
 Timna Valley
 Tisethor
 Titus Petronius Secundus
 Tiu (pharaoh)
 Tiye
 Tiye (20th dynasty)
 Tiy-Merenese
 Tjahapimu
 Tjan (queen)
 Tjanefer
 Tjaru
 Tjauti
 Tjebu
 Tjeker
 Tjenenyet
 Tjesraperet
 Tjetju
 Tjuneroy
 Tlepolemus (general)
 Tlepolemus (regent of Egypt)
 Tobi (month)
 Tomb ANB
 Tomb A.5
 Tomb A.6
 Tomb A.24
 Tomb C.3
 Tomb C.7
 Tomb C.8
 Tomb C.14
 Tomb D.1
 Tomb of Akhethetep
 Tomb of Aline
 Tomb of Anedjib
 Tomb of Hetpet
 Tomb of Horemheb
 Tomb of 'Ip
 Tomb of Meryra
 Tomb of Nebamun
 Tomb of Nefertari
 Tomb of Panehsy
 Tomb of Perneb
 Tomb of Ptahmes
 Tomb of Seti I
 Tomb of Thutmose
 Tomb of Tutankhamun
 Tomb of Two Brothers
 Tomb of Yuya and Thuya
 Tombos (Nubia)
 Tombos Stela
 Tombs of the Nobles (Amarna)
 Townsite-city-region (hieroglyph)
 Trajan's Kiosk
 Transliteration of Ancient Egyptian
 Treasurer (Ancient Egypt)
 Triakontaschoinos
 TT1
 TT2
 TT3
 TT4
 TT5
 TT6
 TT7
 TT8
 TT9 (tomb)
 TT10
 TT11
 TT12
 TT13
 TT14
 TT15
 TT16
 TT17
 TT18
 TT19
 TT20
 TT21
 TT22
 TT23
 TT24
 TT25
 TT26
 TT27
 TT28
 TT29
 TT30
 TT31
 TT32
 TT33 (tomb)
 TT34
 TT35
 TT36
 TT37
 TT38
 TT39
 TT40
 TT41
 TT42
 TT43
 TT44
 TT45
 TT46
 TT47
 TT48
 TT49
 TT50
 TT51
 TT52
 TT55
 TT56
 TT57
 TT58
 TT60
 TT61
 TT62
 TT63
 TT64
 TT65
 TT66
 TT67
 TT68
 TT69
 TT71
 TT72
 TT80
 TT81
 TT82
 TT83
 TT89
 TT93
 TT95
 TT96
 TT97
 TT99
 TT100
 TT104
 TT106
 TT111
 TT120
 TT121
 TT127
 TT133
 TT137
 TT138
 TT147
 TT156
 TT164
 TT168
 TT169
 TT170
 TT171
 TT172
 TT174
 TT177
 TT178
 TT184
 TT187
 TT188
 TT189
 TT191
 TT192
 TT193
 TT194
 TT195
 TT196
 TT210
 TT211
 TT212
 TT213
 TT214
 TT216
 TT223
 TT226
 TT240
 TT255
 TT280
 TT282
 TT311
 TT319
 TT358
 TT359
 TT374
 TT382
 TT383
 TT385
 TT387
 TT388
 TT390
 TT391
 TT406
 TT407
 TT409
 TT410
 TT411
 TT414
 Tulli Papyrus
 Tuna el-Gebel
 Tunip
 Tura, Egypt
 Turin Erotic Papyrus
 Turin King List
 Turin Papyrus Map
 Tushratta
 Tutankhamun
 Tutankhamun and the Daughter of Ra
 Tutankhamun: Enter the Tomb
 Tutankhamun's meteoric iron dagger
 Tutankhamun's mummy
 Tutankhamun's trumpets
 Tutenstein
 Tuthmose (Viceroy of Kush)
 Tutkheperre Shoshenq
 Tutu (Egyptian god)
 Tutu (Egyptian official)
 Tuya (queen)
 Twelfth Dynasty of Egypt
 Twelfth Dynasty of Egypt family tree
 Twentieth Dynasty of Egypt
 Twenty-eighth Dynasty of Egypt
 Twenty-fifth Dynasty of Egypt
 Twenty-fifth Dynasty of Egypt family tree
 Twenty-first Dynasty of Egypt
 Twenty-fourth Dynasty of Egypt
 Twenty-ninth Dynasty of Egypt
 Twenty-second Dynasty of Egypt
 Twenty-seventh Dynasty of Egypt
 Twenty-sixth Dynasty of Egypt
 Twenty-sixth Dynasty of Egypt family tree
 Twenty-third Dynasty of Egypt
 Two Ladies
 Two whips with shen ring (hieroglyph)
 Twosret
 Tyet
 Tyti

U 

 Ubaoner
 Udjahorresnet
 Udjebten
 Ukhhotep II
 Umm El Qa'ab
 Unas
 Unfinished Northern Pyramid of Zawyet El Aryan
 Unfinished obelisk
 Unfinished Pyramid of Abusir
 Union symbol (hieroglyph)
 University of Michigan Papyrology Collection
 Unlucky Mummy
 Unut
 Upper and Lower Egypt
 Upper Egypt
 Uraeus
 Ure mummified cat's head
 Urkunden des ægyptischen Altertums
 Uronarti
 Usekh collar
 User (ancient Egyptian official)
 Useramen
 Userhet
 Userkaf
 Userkare
 Usermontu (mummy)
 Usermontu (vizier)
 Usersatet
 Ushabti

V 

 Valley of the Golden Mummies
 Valley of the Kings
 Valley of the Pharaohs
 Valley of the Queens
 Veil of Isis
 Viceroy of Kush
 Victor Loret
 Victory stele of Esarhaddon
 Vivant Denon
 Vizier (Ancient Egypt)
 Vladimir Golenishchev
 Voyage d'Egypte et de Nubie
 Vulture crown

W 

 Wadi al-Jarf
 Wadi el-Hudi
 Wadi Hammamat
 Wadi Maghareh
 Wadi Tumilat
 Wadj amulet
 Wadjenes
 Wadjet
 Wadjitefni
 Wadjetrenput
 Wadjmose
 Wadj-wer
 Wahibre Ibiau
 Wahkare Khety
 Wahneferhotep
 Wah-Sut
 Wahtye
 Walls of the Ruler
 Wash (pharaoh)
 Was-sceptre
 Washptah
 Water-jugs-in-stand (hieroglyph)
 Wazad
 Wazner
 Webensenu
 Wegaf
 Wehem Mesut
 Wendjebauendjed
 Weneg (Egyptian deity)
 Weneg (pharaoh)
 Wenennefer (High Priest of Osiris)
 Wentawat
 Wepemnofret
 Wepset
 Wepwawet
 Wepwawetemsaf
 Werbauba
 Weres
 Werethekau
 Werner Huß
 Westcar Papyrus
 Wetka
 Wetjes-Hor
 Wḫdw
 White Chapel
 White Pyramid
 Wilbour Papyrus
 Will of Naunakhte
 William Ayres Ward
 William C. Hayes
 William L. Moran
 William the Faience Hippopotamus
 Winged sun
 Wolfardine von Minutoli
 Wolfgang Kosack
 Wolfhart Westendorf
 Wolfram Grajetzki
 Women in ancient Egypt
 Wonderful Ethiopians of the Ancient Cushite Empire
 Wooden tomb model
 Workmen's village
 Workmen's Village, Amarna
 Wosret
 WV22
 WV23
 WV24
 WV25
 WVA

X 

 Xerxes I
 Xerxes II

Y 

 Ya'ammu Nubwoserre
 Yabitiri
 Yam (god)
 Yakareb
 Yakbim Sekhaenre
 Yanassi
 Yanhamu
 Yantin-'Ammu
 Yapa-Hadda
 Yapahu
 Yaqub-Har
 Year 400 Stela
 Yidya
 Younger Memnon
 Yuf
 Yuny
 Yuny (viceroy of Kush)
 Yuya
 Yuyu (High Priest of Osiris)

Z 

 Zacharias I of Makuria
 Zacharias III of Makuria
 Zahi Hawass
 Zahi Hawass bibliography
 Zakaria Goneim
 Zamonth
 Zannanza
 Zatipy
 Zawyet Umm El Rakham
 Zawyet El Aryan
 Zawyet el-Maiyitin
 Zbyněk Žába
 Zenon of Kaunos
 Zimredda of Lachish
 Zimredda of Sidon
 Zita (Hittite prince)
 Zoomorphic palette
 Zvenigorodsky seal
 Zythum

Lists 

 Ancient Egyptian palettes
 Ancient Egyptian papyri
 Ancient Egyptian Royal Consorts
 Ancient Egyptian scribes
 Ancient Egyptian sites
 Ancient Egyptian statuary with amulet necklaces
 Ancient Egyptian towns and cities
 Ancient Egyptians
 Burials in the Valley of the Kings
 Children of Ramesses II
 Conflicts in Egypt
 DNA-tested mummies
 Egyptian castles, forts, fortifications and city walls
 Egyptian deities
 Egyptian hieroglyphs
 Egyptian inventions and discoveries
 Egyptian mummies (officials, nobles, and commoners)
 Egyptian mummies (royalty)
 Egyptian obelisks
 Egyptian pyramidia
 Egyptian pyramids
 Egyptologists
 Female Egyptologists
 Finds in Egyptian pyramids
 Gardiner's sign list
 Governors of Roman Egypt
 Historical capitals of Egypt
 Lepsius list of pyramids
 MMA Tombs
 Monarchs of Kerma
 Monarchs of Kush
 Museums of Egyptian antiquities
 Obelisks in Rome
 Pharaohs
 Portraiture offerings with Ancient Egyptian hieroglyphs
 Theban tombs

See also 

 Outline of ancient Egypt

 
Ancient Egypt-related lists